The paradise tanager (Tangara chilensis) is a brilliantly multicolored, medium-sized songbird whose length varies between 13.5 and 15 cm. It has a light green head, sky blue underparts and black upper body plumage. Depending on subspecies, the behind is yellow and red or all red. The beak is black and the legs are grey. It is native to the Amazon rainforest.

Found in humid tropical and subtropical forests in the western and northern Amazon Basin in South America, the species can be found in Venezuela, Peru, Colombia, Ecuador, Bolivia and Brazil. Despite its scientific name, it is not found in Chile.

References

External links 

 Paradise Tanager videos on the Internet Bird Collection
 BirdLife Species Factsheet
 Photo-Medium Res; Article borderland-tours
 Stamps (for Ecuador, Guyana, Paraguay, Suriname)
 Paradise Tanager photo gallery VIREO

paradise tanager
Birds of the Amazon Basin
Birds of the Guianas
paradise tanager